Wolves at Our Door is a 1997 documentary film about the "Sawtooth Pack", a group of wolves in the Sawtooth Mountains in Idaho. The film was produced and directed by Jim Dutcher and first aired on The Discovery Channel. It is narrated by Richard Kiley. A two–hour sequel, Living with Wolves, was released in 2005.

Production
In 1990, filmmaker, Jim Dutcher, began observing a pack of wolves in the Sawtooth Mountains in Idaho. Later joined by his wife, Jamie Dutcher, the couple hand-raised and bottle fed pups before releasing them within a larger encampment. Having gained their trust, the Dutcher's were able to film and record the wolves in close proximity. Using both visual and audio recordings, they documented the pack's hierarchy, vocalizations, and behavior.

Sawtooth Pack
Initially starting with one pair of adults, Makuyi and Akai, the pack grew to include:
Original wolves
Akai, adult, original alpha male, was mid–rank from his home in Minnesota
Makuyi, adult, mated with Akai, from a wolf shelter in Montana
Motaki, (Blackfoot for "shadow"), original omega female, killed by a mountain lion
First litter (1991)
Kamots, (Blackfoot for "freedom"), the alpha male
Lakota, (Sioux for "friend"), the omega male
Second litter (1992)
Amani, (Blackfoot for "speaking the truth"), brother of Matsi
Motomo, (Blackfoot for "he who goes first"), brother of Matsi
Matsi, (Blackfoot for "sweet and brave), the beta male
Third litter (1994)
Chemukh, (Nez Perce for "black"), the alpha female
Wahots, (Nez Perce for "likes to howl"), brother of Wyakin and Chemukh
Wyakin, (Nez Perce for "spirit"), other female in the pack
Fourth litter/Sawtooth pups (1996)
Ayet, (Nez Perce for "girl"), pup of Kamots and Chemukh
Piyip, (Nez Perce "boy"), pup of Kamots and Chemukh
Motaki, pup of Kamots and Chemukh, named after the original omega female
The final surviving pack member, Piyip, died on July 5, 2013 (age 17).

Airing and release
The Discovery Channel first aired the film on October 27, 1997. It was the channel's most successful wildlife documentary film and would garner three Emmy Award nominations, winning two for cinematography and sound mixing. It was released on DVD on June 19, 2001.

Awards and accolades
In 1998 Wolves at Our Door was nominated for an Emmy Award in the Outstanding Nonfiction Special category. Jim Dutcher received the Emmy award for Outstanding Cinematography for Nonfiction Programming. Jamie Dutcher received the Emmy award for Outstanding Sound Mixing for Nonfiction Programming.

References

Further reading
 Dutcher, J., Dutcher, J., & Manfull, J. (2002). Wolves at Our Door: The Extraordinary Story of the Couple Who Lived with Wolves. New York: Pocket Books.

External links

1997 documentary films
1997 films
Discovery Channel original programming
Documentary films about nature
American documentary television films
1990s American films